The Tanger Family Bicentennial Garden is a historical garden and visitor center located in Greensboro, North Carolina.  It was created in 1976 to recognize and honor the 200th anniversary of the United States (its bicentennial).  The garden features a man-made circulating stream, a wedding gazebo, and a variety of artistic and historical sculptures.  Throughout, many different plants and shrubs decorate the landscape including annuals, perennials, flowering trees, and canopy trees.  Greensboro Beautiful is a non-profit organization that raises funds for the garden, while the Greensboro Parks and Recreation Department oversees the events offered.

Events
The gazebo on garden grounds is a popular site for weddings and other events.  Located in the center of the Tanger Family Bicentennial Garden, the gazebo can accommodate up to 100 people.

On August 17, 2010, roughly $8,000 dollars worth of copper roofing was stolen from the gazebo and kiosk.  The theft was discovered the following morning at 7:30 by garden staff.

Gallery

References 

Geography of Greensboro, North Carolina
Gardens in North Carolina
1976 establishments in North Carolina
Tourist attractions in Greensboro, North Carolina
Protected areas of Guilford County, North Carolina